Gisborne railway station is located on the Deniliquin line in Victoria, Australia. It serves the town of New Gisborne, and it opened on 8 July 1861.

History

Gisborne station opened on 8 July 1861, when the railway line was extended from Sunbury to Woodend. Like the town itself, the station was after Henry Fyshe Gisborne, who was Commissioner of Crown Lands for the Port Phillip District between 1839-1840.

In 1910, the station became a block post for all trains on the line. In 1922, an interlocking frame was provided in the station building on Platform 1.

By 1990, siding "B" and the track that passed through the former goods shed were abolished. In 1994, the connection between siding "A" and a crossover, that was located at the Up end of the station, was removed. In 1996, boom barriers replaced hand gates at the Station Road level crossing, located at the Down end of the station. The Up end crossover was also removed by that year. In 2000, the goods shed was destroyed by fire.

On 17 January 2005, the interlocking frame was abolished. In March 2014, the platforms were extended to accommodate longer trains.

Platforms and services

Gisborne has two side platforms. During the morning peak, services to Southern Cross depart from Platform 2, and services to Bendigo depart from Platform 1, with this arrangement reversing after 9:00am. This is to allow services in the peak direction of travel to use the single 160 km/h track that was upgraded in 2006, as part of the Regional Fast Rail project.

The station is serviced by V/Line Bendigo, Echuca and Swan Hill line services.

Platform 1:
  services to Kyneton, Bendigo, Epsom, Eaglehawk and Southern Cross
  services to Echuca and Southern Cross
  services to Swan Hill and Southern Cross

Platform 2:
  services to Kyneton, Bendigo, Epsom, Eaglehawk and Southern Cross
  services to Echuca and Southern Cross
  services to Swan Hill and Southern Cross

Transport links

Dysons operates one route via Gisborne station, under contract to Public Transport Victoria:
 Lancefield – Gisborne

Gisborne Transit operates two routes to and from Gisborne station, under contract to Public Transport Victoria:
 : to Gisborne
 : to Gisborne (on-demand service)

References

External links
 
 Victorian Railway Stations gallery
 Melway map at street-directory.com.au

Regional railway stations in Victoria (Australia)
Shire of Macedon Ranges